119P/Parker–Hartley is a periodic comet in the Solar System.

References

External links 
 Orbital simulation from JPL (Java) / Horizons Ephemeris
 119P/Parker-Hartley – Seiichi Yoshida @ aerith.net
 119P at Kronk's Cometography

Periodic comets
0119
Discoveries by Malcolm Hartley
Comets in 2014
19890302